James Forrest Morrison (born September 23, 1952), is an American former professional baseball second baseman and third baseman, who played in Major League Baseball (MLB) for the Philadelphia Phillies, Chicago White Sox, Pittsburgh Pirates, Detroit Tigers, and Atlanta Braves from  to . 

Morrison managed the Charlotte Stone Crabs, a Class A affiliate of the Tampa Bay Rays, until 2012. Previously he was manager of the Columbus Catfish, another Rays Class A affiliate, and led them to the South Atlantic League Championship in 2007. Currently he is the manager of the Florida Complex League Rays

Career statistics
In 12 seasons covering 1089 games, Morrison compiled a .260 batting average with 371 runs, 112 home runs and 435 RBIs. He finished his career with a .963 fielding percentage.

References

External links

Jim Morrison at Baseball Gauge
Jim Morrison at Pura Pelota (Venezuelan Professional Baseball League)

1952 births
Living people
Águilas del Zulia players
Atlanta Braves players
Baseball players from Pensacola, Florida
Bradenton Explorers players
Chicago White Sox players
Detroit Tigers players
Georgia Southern Eagles baseball players
Major League Baseball infielders
Minor league baseball managers
Oklahoma City 89ers players
Philadelphia Phillies players
Pittsburgh Pirates players
Rocky Mount Phillies players
South Georgia Tigers baseball players
Spartanburg Phillies players
Sportspeople from Pensacola, Florida
American expatriate baseball players in Venezuela
American expatriate baseball players in Italy